Khaled Al-Sada (born 18 April 1967) is a Bahraini sailor. He competed in the 1996 Summer Olympics.

References

1967 births
Living people
Sailors at the 1996 Summer Olympics – Soling
Bahraini male sailors (sport)
Olympic sailors of Bahrain